Eureka is an unincorporated town and census-designated places in and the county seat of Eureka County, Nevada, United States. With a population of 480 as of the  2018 American Community Survey 5-Year Estimates, it is by far the largest community in Eureka County. Attractions include the Eureka Opera House (built in 1880 and restored in 1993), Raine’s Market and Wildlife Museum (built 1887), the Jackson House Hotel (built 1877), and the Eureka Sentinel Museum (housed in the 1879 Eureka Sentinel Newspaper Building).

Eureka is part of the Elko Micropolitan Statistical Area.

Demographics

Geography and climate
At the 2018 American Community Survey 5-Year Estimates, the population of the census-designated place of Eureka was 480, while the total population of Eureka and the surrounding area (Eureka CCD, Eureka County, Nevada) was 1,313.

The town is located along the Lincoln Highway / U.S. Route 50, nicknamed "The Loneliest Road in America": aptly named, as the nearest towns along the highway are Austin ( west) and Ely ( east).

The climate is typical of the Great Basin: hot and dry with cool mornings in the summer with occasional monsoonal thunderstorms from late July through August; cold and relatively dry in the winter.

Under the Köppen climate classification, Eureka has a warm-summer humid continental climate (Dfb).

History

The town was first settled in 1864 by a group of silver prospectors from nearby Austin, who discovered rock containing a silver-lead ore on nearby Prospect Peak. According to tradition, the town was named from an incident when a prospector exclaimed "Eureka!" when he discovered deposits of silver ore. The town became the county seat in 1873, when Eureka County was carved out of adjacent Lander, Elko, and White Pine counties.

Mining, especially for lead, was the town's economic mainstay, as the nearby hillsides ranked as Nevada's second-richest mineral producer, behind western Nevada's Comstock Lode. Two of the largest concerns in Eureka were the Richmond Mining Company and the Eureka Mining Company. These two companies often collided, and in one instance, their litigation reached the U.S Supreme Court. The population boomed, reaching a high of 10,000 by 1878, but shrank as decreasing mine production and changing market conditions led to the closing of mines.

The town was serviced by the narrow gauge Eureka and Palisade Railroad from 1873 to 1938.

Public services
Eureka is served by an all-volunteer fire department, which provides fire protection, rescue, and vehicle rescue services for Eureka and the surrounding areas. In 2009 a new brick and steel fire house was built on Main Street in Eureka. At the time of its building it was the second largest fire house in the state. In addition to being a modern fire fighting facility, it contains a museum of Eureka fire department equipment and vehicles dating back to the 1870s. The fire-museum may be viewed through the large glass windows, or a tour may be taken by contacting a local fireman.

Eureka boasts three parks, a modern enclosed swimming facility, two baseball fields, a track, and football field.

The 1880s Eureka Opera House was re-modeled in recent times and regularly schedules performers.

The 1876 Eureka Court House is both historic and modern. It stands as the functioning governmental and legal center of Eureka County.

Celebrations
July 4, Independence Day, is a huge celebration in Eureka. The Eureka Volunteer Fire Department organizes a parade followed by street events, which require closing central Eureka to vehicular traffic. At 9pm the Eureka Volunteer Fire Department stages a fireworks display.

Education
Eureka County School District is the local school district.

Eureka has a public library, a branch of the Elko-Lander-Eureka County Library System.

Transportation
 Eureka Airport (Nevada)

Notable people
John Cradlebaugh, first delegate to the U.S. House of Representatives from Nevada Territory
Warren J. Ferguson, who served on the United States Court of Appeals for the Ninth Circuit
Antonio Mendez, CIA operative, who orchestrated the smuggling of six US hostages out of Iran. The Academy Award-winning film Argo was based on the experience. Mendez was born in Eureka.

Gallery

References

External links

 Website for the town of Eureka, Nevada 
 JB Monaco Eureka Photo Gallery
 Eureka Self-Guiding Tour; link contains many modern and historical photographs of existing buildings, and historical tales of the area
Eureka, Nevada at Western Mining History
   $1.3 billion plan for moly mine at Mt. Hope

Census-designated places in Nevada
Census-designated places in Eureka County, Nevada
County seats in Nevada
Populated places established in 1864
Elko, Nevada micropolitan area
Unincorporated towns in Nevada
1864 establishments in Nevada
Silver mining in Nevada